The Beijing–Guangzhou railway or Jingguang railway is a major trunk railway that connects Beijing in the north with Guangzhou in the south. The line passes through the capitals of each of them: Shijiazhuang (Hebei), Zhengzhou (Henan), Wuhan (Hubei), Changsha (Hunan) and Guangzhou (Guangdong). The line's two terminals are the Beijing West railway station and the Guangzhou railway station.

Due to abundance of large and medium-sized cities on its route, this railway is widely recognized as the most important conventional railway line in China.

History

The Jingguang railway was originally two independent companies: the Beijing–Hankou railway in the north from Beijing to Hankou, and the Guangdong–Hankou railway in the south from Wuchang to Guangzhou.  Hankou and Wuchang were cities on opposite sides of the Yangtze River that became part of the present city of Wuhan in 1927.

The concession was originally awarded to a Belgian company that was backed by French investors. A strong desire to bring the route under Chinese control led to the formation of the Bank of Communications to secure the financing needed to repatriate the railway. The successful redemption of the railway in 1909 enhanced the prestige of the Communications Clique, which became a powerful political force in the early Republic.

Construction of the Guangdong–Hankou railway (Yuehan railway) began in 1900 and progressed more slowly. The concession was originally awarded to the American China Development Company, but a diplomatic crisis erupted when the Belgians purchased a controlling interest in it.  The concession was cancelled in 1904 to prevent Franco-Belgian interests from controlling the entire Beijing–Guangdong route. The Guangzhou–Sanshui branch line was completed in 1904. The Changsha–Zhuzhou section was then completed in 1911, followed by the Guangzhou–Shaoguan section in 1916, and the Wuchang–Changsha section in 1918. Work on the final section between Zhuzhou and Shaoguan began in 1929 but was not completed until 1936.

On 7 February 1923, workers of the Beijing-Wuhan Railway Workers' association launched a massive strike demanding better workers' rights and protesting oppression by warlords. The strike, organized by Shi Yang and Lin Xiangqian, was an early example of worker mobilization by the Chinese Communist Party.

Major stations

From north to south:

Service

Currently, the Beijing–Kowloon "Jingjiu" through train operates on this line. Prior to 2003, this train called at stops along the route, before border controls were set up at Beijing, which made the compartments to Kowloon sterile, making the intermediate stops available for use only for domestic passengers in separate carriages attached at Guangzhou East Station.

Parallel lines
The Beijing–Kowloon railway, completed in 1996, is another conventional railway connecting Beijing with the Pearl River Delta. It runs mostly within a corridor  to the east of the Beijing–Guangzhou railway.

The Beijing–Guangzhou high-speed railway runs through the same major cities as the original railway, on a slightly different route that avoids built-up areas and has a greater curve radius allowing for higher speeds and a somewhat shorter overall length. In most cities along the line, the high-speed trains stop at different, purpose-built stations, rather than the older stations served by the original line. The Wuhan–Guangzhou section of the high-speed railway opened in 2009, and the Beijing–Wuhan section in 2012.

As consecutive sections of the Beijing–Guangzhou high-speed railway became operational, the railway authorities shifted much of passenger traffic from the original railway to the new high-speed line. This allowed an increase in the amount of freight volume transported over the original route. For example, according to preliminary estimates, after the entire Beijing–Guangzhou high-speed railway opens, the annual freight capacity of the northern half of the Beijing–Guangzhou railway (between its two main freight stations, Beijing's Fengtai West railway station and Wuhan North railway station) would increase by 20 million tons.

Accidents
On 29 June 2009, two passenger trains collided at Chenzhou station, leaving three people dead and 63 injured.

See also

 List of railways in China
 Beijing-Kowloon Railway
 Rail transport in China

References

Railway lines in China
Rail transport in Beijing
Rail transport in Hebei
Rail transport in Henan
Rail transport in Hubei
Rail transport in Hunan
Rail transport in Guangdong
Railway lines opened in 1957
1957 establishments in China